Brunnsviken (literally The Bay of Wells) is a  by  brackish lake in Sweden located on the boundary between Solna Municipality and Stockholm Municipality, connecting to Lilla Värtan through Ålkistan. Around Brunnsviken there are a wide range of interesting buildings and facilities. Brunnsviken stretches all the way from Vasastaden, Stockholm in the south to Bergshamra, Solna in the north, with Hagaparken along the western shoreline. In the 1700s, Gustav III had plans to build a continuous belt of English parks around the lake. Since 1994, Brunnsviken has been a part of the Royal National City Park.

References

Lakes of Stockholm County
Geography of Stockholm